Altisite (IMA symbol: Ati) is an exceedingly rare alkaline titanium aluminosilicate chloride mineral with formula Na3K6Ti2Al2Si8O26Cl3, from alkaline pegmatites. It is named after its composition (ALuminium, TItanium, and SIlicon).

The mineral crystallizes in the monoclinic crystal system with space group C2/m.

References

Inosilicates
Titanium minerals
Sodium minerals
Potassium minerals
Monoclinic minerals
Minerals in space group 12